John Billee (fl. 1873 – January 16, 1890) was a Creek Indian and an American outlaw of the Old West. He operated in Indian Territory with John Willis and the two murdered W. P. Williams  and buried his body in the Kiamichi Mountains. Billie was noted for his bad temper.

Following Billee's arrest by United States Marshals Will Ayers, James Wilkerson, and Perry DuVall (or DuVal) for robbery and murder, he was taken to Fort Smith, Arkansas. During his transportation, he broke free during an overnight stay. Billee slipped out of his handcuffs and killed DuVall with his own pistol. He then wounded Ayers and Wilkerson before being shot and disabled by another [unnamed] guard. Billee and John Willis were tried and condemned. While in custody at Fort Smith, his unruly behavior necessitated his being chained to a cell wall. In spite of his personal plea to be shot by the hangman, he was dragged to the gallows and hanged.

References 

1890 deaths
Outlaws of the American Old West
Year of birth missing
Muscogee people
Place of birth missing
People executed by Arkansas by hanging
American people convicted of murder
People of Indian Territory